C20orf202 (chromosome 20 open reading frame 202) is a protein that in humans is encoded by the C20orf202 gene.
In humans, this gene encodes for a nuclear protein that is primarily expressed in the lung and placenta.

Gene 
C20orf202 is located on the plus strand of chromosome 20 at 20p13.  The gene is 4,826 base pairs long. It spans from chr20:1,184,098-1,188,918, and contains 2 exons.

Transcript 
There is one transcript of C20orf202. The mRNA sequence is 1,609 base pairs long.

Protein 
The protein encoded by C20orf202 is 122 amino acids in length with a predicted molecular mass of 13591 Da and a predicted isoelectric point of 9.13 pl/MW. C20orf202 contains PFAM domain DUF3461 at amino acids 3-67. This domain codes for a protein of unknown function. 
The structure of C20orf202 consists of 46.72% random coils, 42.62% alpha helixes, and 10.66% extended strands.

Regulation

Gene level regulation 

The C20orf202 promoter has many transcription factor binding sites, most notably at the beginning and end of the promoter. These sites are shown in the figure to the right and are listed below with their respective functions.

Transcript level regulation 
MicroRNA binding sites are only found in the 3' UTR of C20orf202. Most of these sites are found in the beginning or end of the 3' UTR, with many located in close proximity to each other. These 3' UTR microRNA binding sites can be seen in the figure to the right.

Protein level regulation 
C20orf202 has many phosphorylation and glycosylation sites throughout the protein. A few of the phosphorylation sites are located in highly conserved regions of the protein.

Expression 
In humans, C20orf202 has moderate mRNA abundance across cells types, though higher than average expression in the kidney and heart, it is not significantly so. Additionally C20orf202 expression increases during fetal development of kidney, lung, and intestinal tissues.

Homology

Paralogs 
C20orf202 has three known paralogs- FAM167a, FAM167b, and AARD.

Orthologs 
C20orf202 orthologs can be found in major groups such as mammals, reptiles, amphibians, and distantly fish.

This table lists several orthologs for C20orf202 including genus and species, common name, taxonomic group, evolutionary date of divergence, accession number, sequence length, sequence identity, and sequence similarity.

Interacting proteins 
Two hybrid prey pooling followed by two hybrid array revealed that C20orf202 is predicted to interact with two other proteins: SNAPAP and HNRNPCL1. SNAPAP (SNARE-associated protein)  has a role in the SNARE binding complex, and is also associated with Hermansky–Pudlak syndrome and tricuspid valve stenosis. HNRNPCL1 (Heterogeneous Nuclear Ribonucleoprotein C Like 1) has a role in RNA binding and nucleosome assembly.

Clinical significance 
C20orf202 has been associated by GWAS to multiple sclerosis. Additionally, through in silico analysis, C20orf202 was identified as being involved in chromosome 20p inv dup del syndrome, a syndrome similar to trisomy 20p.

References 

Human proteins